Bondend is a lane within the village of Upton St Leonards in Gloucestershire, England.

External links

Villages in Gloucestershire
Stroud District